Dismals Canyon is a sandstone gorge near Phil Campbell in Franklin County, Alabama. It was declared a National Natural Landmark in May 1974.

Dismals Canyon is one of only a few places where insects called dismalites (Orfelia fultoni, a distant relative of Arachnocampa) can be found. The larval forms of these flies emit a bright blue-green light to attract food and mates. They cover the canyon wall.

The canyon is home to two waterfalls, Secret Falls and Rainbow Falls, and six natural bridges.

Dismals Canyon is operated commercially as part of an  nature preserve, and a fee is charged for entry. Night tours are conducted to view the dismalites. Camping is available in both traditional campsites and in cabins.

Historical connections 
Chickasaw Native Americans were held captive in the canyon for two weeks before embarking on a forced journey along the Trail of Tears.

In film 
The location was used to film a segment for the Discovery Channel documentary When Dinosaurs Roamed America. That segment was set in Late Cretaceous New Mexico (Moreno Hill Formation).

References

External links 
Official Site
Description of discovery of dismalites 
Dismalites add sparkle to canyon

References 

National Natural Landmarks in Alabama
Protected areas of Franklin County, Alabama
Nature reserves in Alabama
Landforms of Franklin County, Alabama
Canyons and gorges of Alabama